This Year's Love is a 1999 film written and directed by David Kane and set in and around Camden Town in London.

Cast
Dougray Scott as Cameron
Jennifer Ehle as Sophie
Ian Hart as Liam 
Sophie Okonedo as Denise
Douglas Henshall as Danny
Emily Woof as Alice
Catherine McCormack as Hannah
Kathy Burke as Marey
Jamie Foreman as Billy
Bronagh Gallagher as Carol
Eddie Marsan as Eddie
Alastair Galbraith as Willie
Reece Shearsmith as Tourist
Richard Armitage as Smug Man at Party
David Gray as Pub Singer
Billy Mc Elhaney as Deaksie

References

External links 
 
 

1999 films
Films set in London
Films scored by Simon Boswell
1999 romantic comedy-drama films
British romantic comedy-drama films
David Gray (musician)
1990s English-language films
1990s British films